The Salem Methodist Episcopal Church (also known as the Salem Walker Church) and associated Salem Walker Cemetery is a historic church and cemetery located at 7150 Angle Road, in Salem Township, Michigan with a postal designation of Northville, Michigan. The church and cemetery were added to the National Register in 1992 and designated a Michigan State Historic Site in 1991.  The church is significant as one of the least-altered Greek Revival churches existing in the state of Michigan.

History

The first settlers in Salem Township arrived in 1825.  The first burial in the Salem Walker Cemetery took place in 1834.  The congregation of the Salem Methodist Episcopal Church formed in the mid-19th century, and met at various places in the township until the 25 members constructed a church adjacent to the cemetery in 1864.  The congregation grew to about 60 by 1880, but later declined.  Services continued at the church until 1912, after which the congregation abandoned it.  In 1908, the Salem Walker Cemetery association founded to care for the cemetery and in 1930, it contacted the Methodist conference about purchasing the church.  The next year, the Association purchased the church for $200.  The church building is rented for weddings and other gatherings.

In 2012, scenes for the movie The Five-Year Engagement were filmed at the church.

Description
The Salem Walker Church is a single story Greek Revival structure built on a square plan and surmounted by a belfry.  The nearby Salem Walker cemetery is enclosed by a 1909 ornamental fence.

References

Further reading

External links
Salem Walker Church home page (with images)
Salem Walker Cemetery tombstone images

Methodist churches in Michigan
Methodist cemeteries
Churches on the National Register of Historic Places in Michigan
Greek Revival church buildings in Michigan
Churches completed in 1864
Churches in Washtenaw County, Michigan
Wooden churches in Michigan
National Register of Historic Places in Washtenaw County, Michigan
Methodist Episcopal churches in the United States
Michigan State Historic Sites in Washtenaw County, Michigan